In the geometry of hyperbolic 4-space, the order-5 tesseractic honeycomb is one of five compact regular space-filling tessellations (or honeycombs). With Schläfli symbol {4,3,3,5}, it has five 8-cells (also known as tesseracts) around each face. Its dual is the order-4 120-cell honeycomb, {5,3,3,4}.

Related polytopes and honeycombs
It is related to the Euclidean 4-space (order-4) tesseractic honeycomb, {4,3,3,4}, and the 5-cube, {4,3,3,3} in Euclidean 5-space. The 5-cube can also be seen as an order-3 tesseractic honeycomb on the surface of a 4-sphere.

It is analogous to the order-5 cubic honeycomb {4,3,5} and order-5 square tiling {4,5}.

See also 
 List of regular polytopes

References 
Coxeter, Regular Polytopes, 3rd. ed., Dover Publications, 1973. . (Tables I and II: Regular polytopes and honeycombs, pp. 294–296)
Coxeter, The Beauty of Geometry: Twelve Essays, Dover Publications, 1999  (Chapter 10: Regular honeycombs in hyperbolic space, Summary tables II,III,IV,V, p212-213)

Honeycombs (geometry)